Vernia may refer to:
Vernia (album), an album by American rapper Erick Sermon
Vernia (butterfly), a genus of skipper butterflies in the tribe Hesperiini
La Vernia, Texas